Badri Akubardiya (born 11 January 1993) is a Georgian-born Ukrainian professional footballer who plays as a defender for Polish III liga club Concordia Elbląg.

Career
Akubardiya is a product of the Youth Sport School Brovary, RVUFK Kyiv and FC Dynamo youth sportive schools and signed a 3,5-year contract with FC Dynamo in the Ukrainian Premier League in December 2012.

References

External links

1993 births
Living people
Ukrainian people of Georgian descent
Ukrainian footballers
Association football defenders
FC Dynamo Kyiv players
FC Dynamo-2 Kyiv players
FC Zugdidi players
FC Helios Kharkiv players
PFC Sumy players
FC Gomel players
FC Metalurgi Rustavi players
FC Polissya Zhytomyr players
FC Shevardeni-1906 Tbilisi players
Ukraine youth international footballers
Ukraine under-21 international footballers
Ukrainian First League players
Ukrainian Second League players
Erovnuli Liga 2 players
III liga players
Ukrainian expatriate footballers
Expatriate footballers in Georgia (country)
Expatriate footballers in Belarus
Expatriate footballers in Poland
Ukrainian expatriate sportspeople in Georgia (country)
Ukrainian expatriate sportspeople in Belarus
Ukrainian expatriate sportspeople in Poland